North Hoyle Offshore Wind Farm is Wales' first offshore wind farm, and the UK's first major offshore renewable power project. Situated in Liverpool Bay, it commenced operation in 2003.

The Round 1 projects were intended to act as testbeds; building the UK's understanding of offshore wind power, whilst in total also providing well over 1,000 MW of green generating capacity for the UK. It was built using the TIV MPI Resolution, the first jack-up wind turbine installation vessel in the world.

The wind farm's 30 Vestas V80 Offshore wind turbines are each rated at 2 MW capacity, giving a maximum project output of 60 MW. At the time of installation this was the most powerful wind farm in the UK, producing sufficient electricity annually to power 50,000 homes.
Between 2004 and 2010, the capacity factor was between 33 and 36%. Its levelised cost has been estimated at £77/MWh.

Independent surveys carried out for the operators of North Hoyle have shown that the wind farm is very popular among holidaymakers and local residents. An opinion poll carried out in 2003, after its construction, showed that 73% of people expressed support for the project and only 5% opposed it.

North Hoyle was developed, built and is operated by RWE npower renewables (formerly National Wind Power); npower renewables also owns the neighbouring Rhyl Flats and Gwynt y Môr offshore wind farms.

See also

 List of offshore wind farms in the United Kingdom
 List of offshore wind farms in the Irish Sea
 Wind power in the United Kingdom

References

External links

North Hoyle, RWE Innogy

Offshore wind farms in the Irish Sea
Wind farms in Wales
RWE
Round 1 offshore wind farms
Buildings and structures in Denbighshire
2004 establishments in Wales
Energy infrastructure completed in 2004